Jean-Joseph Dassy, a French historical and portrait painter, and lithographer, was born at Marseilles on 27 December 1791, and died in the same city on 27 July 1865. 

He studied under Girodet-Trioson, and commenced exhibiting at the Paris Salon in 1819. There are several pictures by him at Versailles, among which are 'The Battle of Saucourt' and 'Charibert.'

Biography
Jean-Joseph Dassy was born on 27 December 1791 in Marseille. His father was a mason. His younger brother Louis-Toussaint Dassy was destined for the priesthood while his other two younger brothers, Pierre and Hippolyte, helped their father in his marble workshop. Three of his sisters were nuns.

Initially a student of Goubaud and Aubert at the École des Beaux-Arts in Marseille, he then went to Paris where, in 1817, he became one of the best students of Girodet-Trioson.

Works

Historical scenes

Museum of Art and History of Cholet
General Précy, 1829, deposit of the National Museum of the Castles of Versailles and Trianon, 1914.

Hall of the Crusades, Versailles
Combat of Robert, Duke of Normandy, with a Saracen Warrior

National Museum of the Castles of Versailles and Trianon
 Caribert, Frankish King of Paris and Western Gaul (died in 567)
 Louis I the Pious (778-840), Emperor of the West

Religious scenes

Notes

References

Further reading

1796 births
1865 deaths
19th-century French painters
French male painters
Artists from Marseille
19th-century French male artists
18th-century French male artists